Braye Road is a station on the Alderney Railway, on the island of Alderney. It runs along Braye Harbour.

External links
 Railway’s website

Railway stations in Alderney